The Grès de Boisset ( sandstone) is a geologic formation in France. It preserves fossils dating back to the Rhaetian stage of the Late Triassic period.

Fossil content 
The following fossils have been reported from the formation:

Mammals 
 Thomasia sp.
 ?Kuehneotheriidae indet.

Fish 
 Nemacanthus monilifer
 Birgeria sp.
 Hybodus sp.
 Lissodus sp.
 Pseudodalatias sp.
 Saurichthys sp.

See also 
 List of fossiliferous stratigraphic units in France

References

Bibliography 
 

Geologic formations of France
Triassic System of Europe
Triassic France
Rhaetian Stage
Sandstone formations
Marl formations
Shallow marine deposits
Paleontology in France